Thomas Woodeshick (born December 3, 1941) is a former professional American football running back in the National Football League.

Woodeshick played football at Hanover Township High School and college football at West Virginia University. As a professional, he played nine seasons with the Philadelphia Eagles and one with the St. Louis Cardinals of the National Football League. In 1968, Woodeshick was the NFL's third leading rusher with 947 yards, was named Second-team All-NFL by the Associated Press, and played in the Pro Bowl at the end of the season.

He was cut by the Eagles just before the start of the 1972 regular season, when the Eagles decided to use other running backs after Woodeshick was hampered by injuries early in training camp.  He said at the time of being cut:

He made an uncredited appearance as a member of the 325th Evac in the climactic football game in the film M*A*S*H.

References

Philadelphia Eagles history page on Woodeshick

1941 births
Living people
American football running backs
Eastern Conference Pro Bowl players
Philadelphia Eagles players
Players of American football from Pennsylvania
Sportspeople from Wilkes-Barre, Pennsylvania
St. Louis Cardinals (football) players
West Virginia Mountaineers football players